Hand to God may refer to:

"Hand to God" (Arrested Development), the 12th episode of the second season of Arrested Development
Hand to God (play), a 2011 play written by Robert Askins